Natural Sequence Farming (NSF) is a method of landscape regeneration devised by the Australian farmer, Peter Andrews, in the 1970s.

The method involves implementing major earthworks on a given area of land that has been devastated by deforestation and general agricultural activities, to emulate the role of natural watercourses in an effort to reverse salinity, slow erosion and increase soil and water quality to enable native vegetation to regenerate and restore the riparian zone.

The method does not require the use of artificial fertilisers or herbicides.

Flood control
Flood events may occur only once every 1 or 2 years; however, they have the ability to enhance or destroy a property. If the waters move too fast over bare land, then they can strip away topsoil and nutrients, leaving behind barren sands. By inserting barriers across creeks and encouraging water to spread outwards, the energy of a flood is reduced, the currents tend to deposit soil from upstream, and the water can soak into the land. This encourages grasses and fast-growing plants to take root.

The role of weeds
Ground cover protects the land from drying and baking, and also stabilises the land in future flood events. While rye and other grasses have long been seen as beneficial crops for grazing, other plants that have been considered weeds can improve the soil, augment the growth of other crops, and assist the diet of grazing animals. These 'weeds' should not be removed. When they die naturally, they should be cut for feed or used as green manure.

Many 'weeds' thrive in only the regenerative cycle. Once the land recovers fertility, the weeds tend to be replaced naturally by trees.

Fraudulent NSF
Since the 1990s, there have been a number of cases where individuals or groups have sought financial gain through offering fraudulent versions of NSF.

See also
Salinity in Australia
Environment of Australia
Conservation in Australia
Irrigation in Australia
Climate change in Australia
Seawater Greenhouse

References

Agriculture in Australia